Alex Nussbaum is a comedian, actor, character designer, and writer.

He has been nominated for a Canadian Comedy Award for Best Male Standup.

He has appeared on Just For Laughs, Comedy Now!, and is a regular judge on the MuchMusic show Video on Trial.

He has acted in the short lived Cartoon Network show Pink Panther and Pals playing the show's antagonist, Big Nose, as well as many guest characters.

Filmography 
 2002 : Comedy Inc. (TV)
 2003 : The Seán Cullen Show (TV)
 2003 : This Time Around (TV)
 2003 : The Toronto Show (TV) : Featured
 2004 : The 5th Annual Canadian Comedy Awards (TV) : Nominee (Male Stand-up)
 2006 : Monster Warriors (TV) : Robber
 2006 : It's a Boy Girl Thing
 2010 : Pink Panther and Pals (TV) : Big Nose (voice)
 2011: The Pink Panther: A Very Pink Christmas (TV): Big Nose (voice)
 2015 : Odd Squad (TV series): Man with Potato Chip Bag

External links
 
 

Living people
Year of birth missing (living people)
Canadian male television actors
Canadian male comedians